Korah or Kórach, son of Esau, is an individual who is described in the Book of Genesis in the Hebrew Bible.

Life
According to the Book of Genesis , Korah was the son of Esau and Aholibamah, and had two brothers, Jeush and Jaalam.  has Korah's mother, Aholibamah, being daughter of Anah, and granddaughter of Zibeon, making Zibeon Korah's maternal great grandfather. The same verse repeats Genesis 36:5 and names his two brothers again. Anah in Genesis 36:2,14,18,25 mentioned above is the same as the Anah, the son of Zibeon in verse 24. In verse 2 and 14 it says, "Aholibamah the daughter of Anah, the daughter of Zibeon the Hivite." Some are confused with this wording and believe that it is saying that Anah is a daughter of Zibeon. In verse 24 it clearly says that Zibeon's two sons were Ajah and Anah. Since the original text does not have a literal word for "granddaughter", the word bat ("daughter") was used in both cases. But this sentence is stating that Aholibamah is the daughter of Anah and the "granddaughter" of Zibeon, not that Anah is the daughter of Zibeon.

Esau had multiple wives and Korah is also listed as a grandson of Esau through Eliphaz, causing some confusion. Esau and his wife Adah bore Eliphaz.  states that Eliphaz bore a number of sons (called here, dukes) that came from his son Eliphaz, and one of them is Duke Korah. It is not unreasonable that Esau had a son and a grandson named Korah. However it is more accurately viewed rather as a grandson being one of the sons.

Other individuals named Korah

Korah, son of Izhar, is a better known individual, who appears in the Book of Numbers.

References

Book of Genesis people